The 1986 South Carolina Gamecocks football team represented the University of South Carolina as an independent during the 1986 NCAA Division I-A football season. Led by fourth-year head coach Joe Morrison, the Gamecocks compiled a record of 3–6–2.

Schedule

References

South Carolina
South Carolina Gamecocks football seasons
South Carolina Gamecocks football